Peter Kalmus may refer to:

Peter Kalmus (physicist), British particle physicist, born 1933
Peter Kalmus (artist), Slovak artist and activist, born 1953
Peter Kalmus (climate scientist), American academic, born 1974